Minuartia dirphya is a rare species of plant in the family Caryophyllaceae. It is endemic to Mt. Dirfi on Euboea in Greece. It is restricted to the higher peaks of this single mountain on an island with many endemic plant species. Its natural habitat is Mediterranean-type shrubby vegetation. It is threatened by habitat loss.

References

Further reading
Trigas, P. & G. Iatroú. (2008). A new species of Minuartia (Caryophyllaceae) from the island of Evvia (Greece). Nordic Journal of Botany 23:4 415–25.

dirphya
Flora of Greece
Critically endangered plants
Plants described in 2008
Taxonomy articles created by Polbot